Raavanan is a 2010 Indian Tamil-language epic action-adventure film co-written, co-produced, and directed by Mani Ratnam.The film stars Vikram, Aishwarya Rai Bachchan and Prithviraj Sukumaran with a supporting cast led by Karthik, Prabhu Ganeshan and Priyamani. It marked Aishwarya Rai’s return to Tamil after a decade gap, since her last Tamil film, Kandukondain Kandukondain (2000). The film follows the crux of the epic Ramayana, with a ruthless cop named Dev Prakash Subramaniam, who is on a quest to find a tribal leader-turned naxalite named Veeraiya as he had kidnapped his wife Raagini, who is suffering from Stockholm syndrome and begins to develop emotions for Veeraiya after learning his purpose. 

Raavanan was announced in February 2008, amidst much hype of the celebrated director, Mani Ratnam's return to Tamil films, whilst Vikram's and Aishwarya Rai Bachchan's casting creating more anticipation. Shooting began soon after, and took place in various locations with a record number of extras in areas including Chalakudy, Kerala and Ooty, Tamil Nadu amongst other regions throughout India. The film's music was composed by A. R. Rahman, with lyrics written by Vairamuthu, the cinematography was handled by V. Manikandan and Santhosh Sivan, and editing done by A. Sreekar Prasad.

The film was also made simultaneously in Hindi as Raavan, with Abhishek Bachchan reprising Vikram's role and Vikram playing the protagonist, while Aishwarya Rai reprises her role from the original.  Furthermore, the film was dubbed in Telugu as Villain. All the three versions were released simultaneously on 18 June 2010 worldwide.

Plot 
A naxalite named Veeraiya and his gang are busy distracting the cops, where police vehicles are set ablaze and women seduce cops into a trap whereby Veera's henchmen attacks and brutally kill them. Whilst on a boating trip, Raagini is kidnapped by Veera, where her husband ASP Dev Prakash Subramaniam, is informed of the incident. It is revealed that Veera is a local hero in his village, who runs a parallel government in rural areas near Tirunelveli, with his brothers – Singarasu and Sakkarai. Though considered a naxalite by the local police, Veera is respected by the villagers. He kidnaps Raagini hoping to avenge the death of his sister Vennila, where he brings her to a cliff to kill her. She refuses to die at his hands and jumps off the cliff into the water far below, hoping to kill herself, but to no avail. 

This causes Veera to hold off the murder, being unable to kill someone who has no fear of death. Dev and his team enter the forests with the aid of Gnanaprakasam, a local forest guard. Despite searching deep in the forests, Dev is unable to hunt down Veera. Meanwhile, Raagini (who is actually suffering from Stockholm Syndrome) learns that Dev had led an encounter against Veera during Vennila's wedding, where his shot grazes Veera in the neck. Fighting for his life, Veera is unable to protect his sister and is led out of the fiasco by his gang. The police pressurise Vennila into revealing Veera's hideout. When she refuses, she was subjected to torture and was assaulted by the cops. Veera returned home to find Vennila depressed and traumatised. The next day, Vennila committed suicide by drowning in a nearby well. Unhappy with the ways of leading the war causing distress to his gang, Sakkarai offers a truce to Dev, who initially seems to agree. 

When Sakkarai arrives from his hideout, Dev shoots him to death revealing that he considers the destruction of Veera as more important than saving Raagini. Veera and Singarasu are enraged and attack Dev's camp where they wipe out completely. A final confrontation ensues between Veera and Dev on a rickety bridge where Veera triumphs over Dev, but leaves him as Dev told that he is leaving him alive because of Raagini. Dev manages to extricate himself out and finds Raagini bound and tied up,  with Veera leaving her. While returning to their hometown in Tiruchirappalli, Dev accuses Raagini of infidelity and informs her that Veera actually told him. Furious, Raagini leaves Dev to meet Veera through Singarasu, where she manages to meet him and asks him about the accusation. Veera denies the accusation, where the duo quickly realises that Dev lied, hoping Raagini would lead him to his hideout. Dev appears with a police team and confronts Veera. Raagini tries to save Veera, but he pushes her out of the line of fire, and is shot multiple times, where Veera falls to his death with a smile while Ragini is distraught.

Cast 
 Vikram as Veeraiya "Veera", a Naxalite in rural Thirunelveli. He is nicknamed Ravana since he is seen as a hero by locals but as a criminal by outsiders.
 Aishwarya Rai Bachchan as Ragini Subramaniam, Dev's wife who is kidnapped by Veera and kept in the jungle for fourteen days. Her character is based on Sita.(voice-over by Rohini) 
 Prithviraj Sukumaran as ASP 2 Dev Prakash Subramaniam IPS, who wants to shut down Veera's crime empire. His character is based on Sri Rama
 Karthik as Gnanaprakasam, A forest ranger who has worked in the jungle for 25 years, and he helps Dev find Veera's gang. Lord Hanuman served as an inspiration for this character
 Prabhu as Singarasu, Veera's elder brother who supervises everything in the gang. He also loves to eat and sleep like the character of Kumbhakarna in Ramayana
 Priyamani as Vennila, Veera's half-sister, who wants to marry Velan. On her wedding day, Veera was shot by Dev, and the police forcefully brings her to the police station, where she is brutually assaulted and eventually commits suicide, prompting the events of the film. Her character is loosely based on Shurpanakha.
 John Vijay as Hemanth Shankar, ACP aka DSP of Tirunelveli and the main perpetrator in Vennila's assault. He is Dev's trusted deputy. His character is loosely based on Lakshmana. 
 Munna as Sakkarai, Veera's younger brother, who is the only educated member of his brothers' gang. Just like the character of Vibhishana, which he is based on, he genuinely wants to stop the ongoing civil war and bring peace to the land. 
 Vaiyapuri as Raasathi, a transgender woman in the village.
 Ranjitha as Annam, Singgarasu's wife. Her character is based on Vajramala in the Ramayana. 
 Varsha as Poonkodi
 Ashwanth Thilak as Velan, Vennila's lover, who left her at the altar out of fear of the police. His character is based on Vidyutjihva in the Ramayana.
 Azhagam Perumal as the photographer who takes photos of Ragini
 Stanley as Padakotti.
 Lakshmy Ramakrishnan as Velan's mother.
 Elizabeth as Vennila's mother. Her character is based on Kaikesi in the Ramayana. 
 Saravana Subbiah as Ranjith, Veera's spy in Dev's gang. His character is based on Shuka and Sarana in the Ramayana. 
 Chaams as the wedding photographer.

Production

Development 
During the making of his 2007 biopic Guru starring Abhishek Bachchan and Aishwarya Rai Bachchan, Mani Ratnam had finalised a script for his next directorial venture titled Lajjo. Based on a short story by Ismat Chughtai, it was a musical period film set in the desert and was to star Aamir Khan and Kareena Kapoor in the lead. Though the film was slated to go on floors after the release of the former, there were reports of a fall-out between Ratnam and Khan due to creative differences. While cinematographer P. C. Sreeram denied the reports, the film's would-be lyricist Gulzar said there were actually problems with acquiring the copyright of the story, and composer A. R. Rahman even confirmed to having completed 80% of the film score. Yet, the project was put on the back burner for reasons unknown.

Following the critical and commercial success of Guru, Ratnam announced his next film in February 2008. A modern-day retelling of the mythological epic Ramayana, the film again features the real life couple in the lead. The film was initially planned to be made only in Hindi and the idea for the Tamil version came later. In January 2009, while the film was in the making, it was further decided to dub the Tamil version to Telugu making it a tri-lingual. While the film was yet to be titled, it was widely reported in the media that the Tamil version was titled Ashokavanam in reference to the place where Sita was held captive by Ravana. Further reports emerged stating that since director Kasthuri Raja has already registered the title for his project, Ratnam has requested him for using the title. Later, Vikram, the lead actor, clarified in an interview that the film was tentatively titled Ravana but was wrongly reported as Ashokavanam. Subsequently, the film was titled Raavan in Hindi, Raavanan in Tamil and Villain in Telugu.

While the plot is inspired by Ramayana, the story is narrated from Ravana's perspective making him the protagonist. The film is centered on the 'Ashokavanam' episode where Ravana kidnaps Sita and keeps her in Asokavanam. Later Rama ventures to save his wife and bring her back.

Casting 
While Bachchan and Vikram were roped in for the contrasting leads in Hindi, Ratnam asked them to swap roles in Tamil. Though Bachchan agreed initially, he grew sceptical being unfamiliar with the language. Eventually Prithviraj was cast in his place. Rai plays the female lead in both versions of the film. After a brief hiatus, Karthik made a comeback with this film, collaborating with Ratnam for the third time after Mouna Ragam and Agni Natchathiram. Prabhu was cast in a prominent role, joining hands with Ratnam after Agni Natchathiram and Anjali. While Priyamani was cast as Ravana's sister, Munna was signed up to play a role synonymous with Vibhishana. Bipasha Basu was to play the role of Mandodari, which was later scrapped to keep the film short. Likewise, singer Vidya Rao's role as the mother of Aishwarya Rai's character was also cut from the final version. Comedian Vaiyapuri plays a transgender.

The cinematography was initially handled by V. Manikandan, but it was later taken over by Santosh Sivan, when the former left the project. The editing was done by Ratnam's regular, Sreekar Prasad, since Alaipayuthey. Rai's costumes were exclusively designed by fashion designer Sabyasachi Mukherjee. Choreography was by Ganesh Acharya, Brinda, Shobana, and Astad Deboo. Peter Hein and Shyam Koushal choreographed the action sequences and Samir Chanda took care of production design.

Filming 
The film was predominantly shot outdoors in various hitherto unseen locations in and around India. Shooting took place at Tumkur (Karnataka), Orchha near Jhansi and the forests of Madhya Pradesh, Mahabaleshwar in Maharashtra. It was also reported that Ratnam had planned to shoot at Sri Lanka but decided against it owing to insurgency by the rebel group LTTE. But Ratnam dismissed the reports as rumours.

Principal photography commenced in October 2008, in the forests near Kochi, Kerala. A few scenes were filmed at Athirappilly Falls, Ratnam's favourite location. Incidentally, he has shot for the songs 'Jiya Jale' in Dil Se.. and 'Barso Re' in Guru at the same location. Forest officials banned the shooting at Malayattoor, an eco-tourism centre, for violating rules and constructing temporary huts, delaying the shoot for 11 days until the issues were resolved on 22 October 2008, while laying down reworked rules. The second leg of the shooting at Ooty that began in December 2008 was also delayed as local cab drivers protested the use of film federation (FEFSI) vehicles which affected their business, forcing a dejected Ratnam to call off the shoot temporarily and move on to Hogenakkal Falls. In February 2009, the crew advanced to Kolkata where the song 'Kalvare' was shot by the banks of Hooghly at Agarpara. Later, as the shooting resumed and progressed at Ooty, Ratnam fell ill in April 2009 and was hospitalised at Apollo Hospitals, causing a further delay of 47 days until filming resumed in June 2009 following his recovery. As the numerous delays affected his other projects, DOP Manikandan walked out in May and was replaced by Santosh Sivan. By July, the crew moved back to Kerala, to reshoot a few scenes at Chalakudy as Ratnam was reportedly unsatisfied after seeing the rushes. This time around, heavy rains played spoilsport leading to another delay in filming. Moreover, when an elephant brought for the shoot ran amok killing the mahout, the Animal Welfare Board served a show cause notice to the production company (Madras Talkies) for not taking permission to use elephants.

The film began its last schedule in August 2009 at the Malshej Ghats in Maharashtra where the climax sequence was shot, the final encounter taking place on a wooden bridge. Production designer Samir Chanda built three identical bridges to facilitate the scene to be captured from different angles. Though initially planned to be built either in Sri Lanka, Australia or South Africa, the bridge was constructed in Mumbai to reduce costs. While bad weather and heavy rains disrupted shoot for a few days, the forest department filed cases against some crew members for trespassing. The film went into post-production by the end of 2009.

Numerous action sequences were performed by the actors. The actors suffered from real cuts and bruises so they didn't need make up. For his introduction scene, the protagonist has to jump from a 90-foot high cliff near the Hogenakkal Falls into the river below. This risky dive was performed by a body double, Balram, a Bangalore based former national diving champion. Kalarippayattu, a martial art form originating from Kerala, was also featured in the film. Sunil Kumar, a Kalari gym trainer from Kozhikode, trained the actors. Contemporary dancer Astad Deboo choreographed a stunt scene for the film.

Vikram got his hair cropped short for his look and it was kept under wraps until the release. Supporting actor Munna tonsured his head and went bald for a scene. Rai was training in Tamil to voice her lines. While Ratnam was impressed with her Tamil and had planned to let her dub, actress Rohini, who had earlier dubbed for Rai in Iruvar and Guru, ended up lending her voice.

Music 
Mani Ratnam's norm composer A. R. Rahman, was roped in to compose the film's soundtrack, collaborating with actor Vikram after a gap of 16 years, since Pudhiya Mannargal (1994). The soundtrack album which was released by Sony Music on 28 May 2010, features six songs with lyrics penned by Vairamuthu, except for the song "Veera", which was penned by Mani Ratnam himself. The same soundtrack was used for the Hindi version of the film, titled Raavan, and the dubbed Telugu version of the film Villain, with the lyrics for the former was penned by Gulzar and the latter was penned by Veturi, which is his last work before his death in May 2010. While the audio rights of both Tamil and dubbed Telugu version was released by Sony Music, the Hindi version was released by T-Series. While the album has six songs in total, five additional songs, which were featured in the movie was released as a collectors's edition special pack on 10 November 2010.

Release

Marketing 
A 10 min teaser was released for a promo event. The film look was unveiled at Cannes Film Festival. Villain promotion in Andhra.

Film festival screenings 
The film screened at 67th Venice Film Festival. The film was well received at Venice where the audience gave it a thunderous applause after it was screened. The master filmmaker was honoured with the Jaeger-LeCoultre Glory to the Filmmaker Award, an award shared by the likes of legends like Takeshi Kitano, Abbas Kiarostami and Sylvester Stallone. Later, the film has been screened at the 15th Busan International Film Festival. Indian Panorama Film Festival. The film was premiered at the 10th Annual Mahindra Indo-American Arts Council Film Festival in New York City. Jim Luce praised mani ratnam's work and mentioned 'Raavanan is a must see international film of 2010. 29th San Francisco Asian American Film Festival.

Theatrical release 
Prior to its release, the film was given a "U" (Universal) certificate by the Central Board of Film Certification without cuts. Raavanan released in 375 screens worldwide. The overseas distribution rights of Raavanan was sold for a record price of $1.5 million to Ayngaran International. Raavanan was previewed at the Devi-Sri Devi Cinema Complex in Chennai, where it received a standing ovation by film personalities including Rajinikanth. The film was also previewed at INOX and was attended by celebrities from tinsel town. It was released worldwide on 18 June 2010, in 375 Screens (225 Screens in India and 150 Screens Overseas). 'The Telugu version Villain released with 215 screens in Andhra and 25 screens overseas. In the US, it was distributed by Big Cinemas. The satellite rights for the film were acquired by Raj TV for $1.1 million.

Reception

Critical response 
The film received mixed reviews. Malathi Rangarajan of The Hindu called Ravanan a "masterstroke". A. Srivathsan said that it was "Rai's most genuine performance till date". Deepak Kumaar's review. Hindustan Times review. The CNN-IBN stated that "The film is certainly not the best from Mani Ratnam's Madras Talkies, but it can't be dismissed as shabby. Even if this Raavanan has no shades of grey, overall the film falls under the greyish form of art from Mani Ratnam enterprises, and Aishwarya Rai Bachchan plays the strong woman who does not fear her kidnapper. Her performance is worth a mention but her male co-stars steal the show". IANS praises Mani Ratnam's style, but calls some of the performances "inadequate". Twitch Film review. Madurai Messenger review. Rai's performance was also noted as a highlight of the film according to Rediff, with her performance placing her in a "different league" than other Bollywood actresses. Indiaglitz praised the music, cast, dialogues and cinematography, but stated that the first half was "an utter waste of film reels". The cinematography was called "brilliant" by Behindwoods, although they found a "lack of 'Tamil' feel in the film and its music". Sify rated the film as above average and noted "the film's best-written role, Aishwarya Rai has made a sensational comeback as Ragini, is mesmeric and has come out with an award-winning performance. Prithviraj is the ideal foil for Vikram, and is good. The movie lacks the Mani Ratnam touch in the story and screenplay department, and has a wobbly first half, where the story just does not move. The last 10 minutes are the best part of this 2 hours 7 minutes film". Film critic Sudhish Kamath review. On Rotten Tomatoes, the film holds a 67% approval rating, based on 18 reviews with an average score of 6.02/10.

The Tamil version was regarded as the better version of the film in comparison to the Hindi version Raavan, with critics particularly applauding the lead performances and the technical work of the film.

Box office 
like its Hindi counterpart, which tanked at the box office, the Tamil version also not tasted success in the South too. During its opening weekend on 15 screens in Chennai, it was the number one film and netted , an opening weekend record then. Though the film opened to packed houses, it slumped a little due to mixed reviews but later picked up following a local holiday. The film collected $8 million at the box office in the first month of release including $400,000 from Kerala. It went on to make over  600 million at the worldwide box office and remained one of the top Tamil grossers of the year. Uk opening weekend. UK boxoffice second week. New York boxoffice.

Controversy 
It was agreed the film would be screened in Bangalore across 21 screens. When both the versions were screened in more centres, the Karnataka Film Chamber of Commerce (KFCC) approached the court. The film chamber banned the exhibition completely. The Competition Commission of India (CCI), in an interim order, stayed the chamber ban and permitted Reliance Big Entertainment Limited (RBEL) to exhibit the film in 36 cinemas. This order was to be in effect till 22 June 2010.

The film also created a furore in Sri Lanka. Since Amitabh Bachchan, Abhishek and Aishwarya boycotted the IIFA awards that was held in Sri Lanka, the film release was protested and theatres were torched. Films of those who attended IIFA in Sri Lanka were banned in Tamil Nadu.

Accolades
Raavanan was one among the films shortlisted for India's submission to the Academy Awards. V. Manikandan was nominated for Best Cinematography award in the Asia Pacific Screen Awards (APSA). The film was praised by Indian politician Muthuvel Karunanidhi. The film was added to the Austrian Film Museum. Peter Heins was nominated at the World Stunt Awards.

 58th Filmfare Awards South

 Won – Filmfare Best Actor Award – Vikram
 Won – Filmfare Best Male Playback Singer – Karthik
 Nominated – Filmfare Best Supporting Actor Award – Prithviraj

 5th Vijay Awards

 Won – Best Actor Award – Vikram
 Nominated – Best Actress Award – Aishwarya Rai Bachchan
 Nominated – Best Cinematographer – Santhosh Sivan
 Nominated – Best Male Playback Singer – Karthik
 Nominated – Best Female Playback Singer – Anuradha Sriram
 Nominated – Best Female Playback Singer – Shreya Ghoshal
 Nominated – Favorite Director – Mani Ratnam
 Nominated – Favorite Actress – Aishwarya Rai Bachchan

 Tamil Nadu State Film Awards
 Won – Best Actor Award – Vikram

References

External links 
 
 
 
 Raavanan at Box Office Mojo

Indian epic films
Indian action adventure films
Indian action drama films
Indian action thriller films
Films directed by Mani Ratnam
Indian multilingual films
2010 films
Films shot in India
Films shot in Sri Lanka
Films shot in Maharashtra
Films shot in Kerala
Films shot in Tamil Nadu
Films shot in Karnataka
Films shot in Madhya Pradesh
Films shot in Kochi
Films shot in Ooty
Films shot in Thrissur
Films shot in Mumbai
Films shot in Kolkata
2010s Tamil-language films
Films scored by A. R. Rahman
Reliance Entertainment films
Films set in forests
Films shot in Chalakudy
2010 multilingual films
2010s action adventure films
2010 action drama films
2010 action thriller films